WBYT (100.7 FM) is a radio station licensed to Elkhart, Indiana, United States, the station serves the Michiana region.  The station airs a country music format and is currently owned by Pathfinder Communications Corporation.

WBYT is licensed to broadcast in the HD (hybrid) format.

History
The station began broadcasting April 1, 1947, holding the call sign WTRC-FM, and was a sister station to 1340 WTRC. In 1969, the station's call sign was changed to WFIM. WFIM aired an easy listening format. In 1974, the station's call sign was changed to WYEZ, with the station retaining an easy listening format. The station continued airing an easy listening format through the 1980s. On December 13, 1991, the station's call sign was changed to WLTA. The station aired a soft AC format. In June 1994, the station adopted a country music format, branded "B-100", and its call sign was changed to WBYT.

References

External links

Country radio stations in the United States
BYT
Radio stations established in 1947
1947 establishments in Indiana